The Taipei City University of Science and Technology (TPCU) is a technological university located in Beitou District, Taipei, Taiwan.

The university offers undergraduate and graduate programs in various fields, including engineering, business, design, humanities, and social sciences. It is divided into six colleges, which are the College of Engineering, College of Electrical Engineering and Computer Science, College of Business, College of Design, College of Humanities and Social Sciences, and the College of Innovation and Entrepreneurship Education.

History
TPCU's original name "Kuang Wu" is derived from Emperor Guangwu of Han. After entering the 21st century, new school names such as "Northern Taiwan" and "Taipei" were successively changed.

Junior college
1971: Kuang Wu Industry Junior College (光武工業專科學校; 光武工專)
1994: Kuang Wu Industry and Commerce Junior College (光武工商專科學校; 光武專校)

Technological institute
2000: Kuang Wu Institute of Technology (光武技術學院)
2004: Northern Taiwan Institute of Science and Technology (北台科學技術學院)
2006: Technology and Science Institute of Northern Taiwan (北台湾科學技術學院)

Technological university
2012: Taipei Chengshih University of Science and Technology (臺北城市科技大學)
2015: Taipei City University of Science and Technology (臺北城市科技大學)

Faculties
 College of Engineering
 College of Business and Management
 College of Human Ecology

Transportation
The university is accessible within walking distance north west from Zhongyi Station of Taipei Metro.

Notable people
Alien Huang - a Taiwanese singer, actor, television presenter, illustrator and fashion designer.
Ming Jie - a Taiwanese actor and singer.
Kent Tsai - a Taiwanese actor.

See also
 List of universities in Taiwan

External links

 University official website

Taipei City University of Science and Technology
1971 establishments in Taiwan
Educational institutions established in 1971
Universities and colleges in Taipei
Science and technology in Taiwan
Universities and colleges in Taiwan
Technical universities and colleges in Taiwan